Hundsdorf is an Ortsgemeinde – a community belonging to a Verbandsgemeinde – in the Westerwaldkreis in Rhineland-Palatinate, Germany.

Geography

The community lies in the Westerwald between Koblenz and Siegen on the edge of the Kannenbäckerland, a region known for its ceramics industry. Hundsdorf belongs to the Verbandsgemeinde of Ransbach-Baumbach, a kind of collective municipality.

History
In 1243, Hundsdorf had its first documentary mention as Hunisdorp.

Politics

The municipal council is made up of 8 council members who were elected in a majority vote in a municipal election on 13 June 2004.

Regular events
Each year, between Ascension and Whitsun, a Western town is built here in which Western and Indian clubs recreate the atmosphere of the Wild West for a few days under authentic conditions.

In early August each year, Hundsdorf holds its kermis.

Economy and infrastructure

The A 48 with its Höhr-Grenzhausen interchange (AS 12) lies 6 km away. The A 3 (Cologne–Frankfurt) with its Ransbach-Baumbach interchange lies only 5 km away. The nearest InterCityExpress stop is the railway station at Montabaur on the Cologne-Frankfurt high-speed rail line.

References

External links
Hundsdorf 
Local wiki for the Westerwald 

Municipalities in Rhineland-Palatinate
Westerwaldkreis